Wrestling has deep historical roots in Armenia. Wrestling was practiced in the Armenian Highlands since ancient times. Armenians have their own variant of the sport called Kokh. It was recorded that King Tiridates III of Armenia won the Ancient Olympic Games in wrestling in 281 AD. During the Soviet era, wrestling became one of the most practiced sports in Armenia and remained popular after Armenia's independence in 1991. Armenian athletes have been successful at international competitions in the last two decades. Many have become World and European champions, both in Greco-Roman and Freestyle wrestling. Over half of the fifteen Armenian Olympic medalists and the two gold medal winners have been wrestlers. The sport is overseen by the Wrestling Federation of Armenia.

History

Ancient history
At the 265th Olympiad (281 AD) the Armenian King Tiridates III (286–342 AD), who in 301 AD adopted Christianity as the state religion, making Armenia the first Christian nation, became an Olympic Champion in wrestling.

Kokh
Kokh is the Armenian national wrestling, known since the Early Middle Ages. It's considered to be one of the oldest forms of wrestling. It had influenced the Soviet martial sport Sambo.

The winner is the one who throws the opponent on the mat without boosting and/or turning him. Pushing the opponent out of the mat, which has a radius of 7–9 meters, also results in winning. A Kokh fight usually lasts from 5 to 10 minutes. The Kokh fights are often accompanied with Armenian folk music and before the beginning of a fight wrestlers do folk dances.

Two varieties of Kokh are Lori Kokh and Shirak Kokh. The main difference between two styles is between the clothing. In Shirak Kokh, wrestlers wear shalwar pants and are topless and were allowed to grab the legs of the opponent. In Lori Kokh, they wear chokha (traditional Caucasian dress) and have to grab the opponent's dress to throw or push them out. Until the late 1980s, Kokh was practiced in rural areas of Armenia, although no professional Kokh athletes existed. Today, about 700 children in Armenian practice Kokh.

Soviet period
Sports in general and wrestling, particularly, became popular in Armenia in the 1920s and 1930s, but it wasn't until the end of the World War II, when Armenian and Soviet athletes started to appear on international competitions. Sargis Vardanyan became the Soviet champion of Greco-Roman wrestling twice, in 1940 and 1944. In later years, Armenian Greco-Roman wrestlers had significant role in Soviet wrestling. Notable ones included Ruben Karapetyan (1969 first junior world champion), Artem Teryan (First wrestling Olympic medalist), Suren Nalbandyan (1976 Olympic champion), Sanasar Oganisyan (1980 Olympic champion), Norayr Musheghian (1958 World Champion), Benur Pashayan (1982 and 1983 World Champion), Levon Julfalakyan (1986 World Champion), Mnatsakan Iskandaryan (1990, 1991, 1994 World Champion).

Independent Armenia
The Federation of Freestyle Wrestling of Armenia and the Federation of Greco-Roman Wrestling Federation were founded in 1992 and were merged in 1996 forming the Wrestling Federation of Armenia. It is the national governing body of the sport in the country. According to Razmik Stepanyan, secretary of the Armenian Olympic Committee, as of 2009, there were 25 wrestling schools in 10 provinces of Armenia, 304 coaches and 7,454 athletes practicing wrestling.

In 2021, government statistics showed 7,800 wrestlers in Armenia, including 4,000 in freestyle wrestling and 3,800 Greco-Roman wrestling. There were over 700 coaches and trainers in both. A little more than 1,000 people practiced Sambo and 126 practiced Kokh.

Records

Olympics

9 of the 18 Olympic medals of Armenia are from wrestling.

World Championships

Greco-Roman

Freestyle

European Championships

Greco-Roman

Freestyle

European Championships (Women)

World Cup

References

 
Wrestling